Henry George Gould (b Wolverhampton 4 January 1851 – d Dunedin 28 September 1914) was the Archdeacon of Oamaru  from 1897 until his death.

Gould was  born in Wolverhampton and educated at Maidstone Grammar School; and ordained in 1877. His first post was as Curate at Malvern.  Later he held incumbencies at Woodend, Leithfield, Hokitika and Lincoln. He was Vicar of St. Paul's Cathedral, Dunedin from 1907.

References

People from Wolverhampton
People educated at Maidstone Grammar School
Archdeacons of North Otago
1851 births
1914 deaths